The 34th meridian west from Washington is an archaic meridian based on the Washington Meridian and hence 111°2′48.0″ West of Greenwich. The meridian is most notably used as a boundary for four states.

Usage as a boundary
The meridian was first used as a boundary when the Montana Territory was created in 1864. It served as Montana Territory's extreme southwestern boundary. The next usage of the boundary came when the Wyoming Territory was established in 1868, with the meridian as its western boundary. It was also at this time that it became much of the then-Idaho Territory's eastern boundary, as well as the extreme northeastern boundary of the then-Utah Territory. Montana became a state in 1889, with Idaho and Wyoming following the year afterwards. Utah became a state in 1896.

References

Borders of Idaho
Borders of Montana
Borders of Utah
Borders of Wyoming
Meridians (geography)